This is a list of the Ukrainian regions, in order of descending area.

Notes

References

Area
Ukrainian oblasts and territories